Henri Louveau (January 25, 1910 – January 7, 1991) was a racing driver from France.  He participated in two Formula One World Championship Grands Prix, debuting on September 3, 1950.  He scored no championship points.

Louveau came 2nd in the 1949 24 Hours of Le Mans.

Complete Formula One World Championship results
(key)

French racing drivers
French Formula One drivers
1910 births
1991 deaths
24 Hours of Le Mans drivers